The Republic of Poland is a Central European country and member of the European Union and NATO, among others. Poland wields considerable influence in Central and Eastern Europe and is a middle power in international affairs. The foreign policy of Poland is based on four basic commitments: to Atlantic co-operation, to European integration, to international development and to international law.

The Polish economy is fairly open and relies strongly on international trade. Since the collapse of communism and its re-establishment as a democratic nation, Poland has extended its responsibilities and position in European and Western affairs, supporting and establishing friendly foreign relations with both the West and with numerous European countries.

History
Foreign policy topics are covered in the history articles:
 History of Poland
 History of Poland in the Early Modern era (1569–1795)
 History of Poland (1795–1918), when it was split three ways between Germany, Russia and Austria and had no foreign policy
 Duchy of Warsaw (1807–1815) a semi-independent country
History of Poland during World War I
 History of Poland (1918–1939)
History of Poland (1939–1945)
 History of Poland (1945–1989)
 History of Poland (1989–present)

Integration with the West and Europe

After regaining independence in 1989, Poland has ahead on its economic reintegration with the Western world. Poland also has been an active nation in advocating European integration.

In 1994, Poland became an associate member he European Union (EU) and its defensive arm, the Western European Union (WEU). In 1996, Poland achieved full OECD membership and submitted preliminary documentation for full EU membership.

Poland formally joined the European Union in May 2004, along with the other members of the Visegrád Group.

NATO membership
Włodzimierz Cimoszewicz told a 2014 audience at the Wilson Center that Poland sought to join NATO as early as 1992.

In 1997, Poland was invited in the first wave of NATO enlargement at the July 1997 NATO Madrid summit. In March 1999, Poland became a full member of NATO. Poland promoted its NATO candidacy through energetic participation in the Partnership for Peace (PfP) program and through intensified individual dialogue with NATO.

Poland was a part of the multinational force in Iraq.

Bilateral relations

List of countries which Poland established diplomatic relations with:

Africa

Americas

Asia

Europe

Oceania

See also
 List of diplomatic missions in Poland
 List of diplomatic missions of Poland
 Polish involvement in the 2003 invasion of Iraq

References

Further reading
Biskupski, M. B. The History of Poland. Greenwood, 2000. 264 pp. online edition
The Cambridge History of Poland, 2 vols., Cambridge: Cambridge University Press, 1941 (1697–1935), 1950 (to 1696). New York: Octagon Books, 1971 online edition vol 1 to 1696, old fashioned but highly detailed
Davies, Norman. God's Playground. A History of Poland. Vol. 2: 1795 to the Present. Oxford: Oxford University Press, 1982 / .
Davies, Norman. Heart of Europe: A Short History of Poland. Oxford University Press, 1984. 511 pp. excerpt and text search
 
Frucht, Richard. Encyclopedia of Eastern Europe: From the Congress of Vienna to the Fall of Communism Garland Pub., 2000 online edition
 Gerson Louis L.  Woodrow Wilson and the Rebirth of Poland 1914-1920  (1972)
 Hetherington, Peter. Unvanquished: Joseph Pilsudski, Resurrected Poland, and the Struggle for Eastern Europe (2012) 752pp  excerpt and text search
Kenney, Padraic. "After the Blank Spots Are Filled: Recent Perspectives on Modern Poland," Journal of Modern History (2007) 79#1 pp 134–61, in JSTOR historiography
 Klatt, Malgorzata. "Poland and its Eastern neighbours: Foreign policy principles." Journal of Contemporary European Research 7.1 (2011): 61-76. online
 Korbel, Josef. Poland Between East and West: Soviet and German Diplomacy toward Poland, 1919–1933 (Princeton University Press, 1963)
 Kuźniar, R.  ed. Poland's Security Policy 1989-2000 (Warsaw: Scholar Publishing House, 2001).
Lerski, George J. Historical Dictionary of Poland, 966-1945. Greenwood, 1996. 750 pp. online
Leslie, R. F. et al. The History of Poland since 1863. Cambridge U. Press, 1980. 494 pp. excerpt
Lukowski, Jerzy and Zawadzki, Hubert. A Concise History of Poland. (2nd ed. Cambridge U. Press, 2006). 408pp. excerpts and search
 Magocsi,  Paul Robert t al.  A History of East Central Europe (1974). 
Pogonowski, Iwo Cyprian. Poland: A Historical Atlas. Hippocrene, 1987. 321 pp.
Prazmowska, Anita J. A History of Poland (2004\)
Sanford, George. Historical Dictionary of Poland. Scarecrow Press, 2003. 291 pp.
 Snyder, Timothy. The Reconstruction of Nations: Poland, Ukraine, Lithuania, Belarus, 1569-1999 (2003). 
 Wróbel, Piotr. Historical Dictionary of Poland, 1945-1996. Greenwood, 1998. 397 pp.
 Zięba, Ryszard. Poland's Foreign and Security Policy Springer, 2020) online

 
 
.
1795
.
1900
1910
1795